Patrick Frederick "Pat" Conlon (born 1959) is a former South Australian politician who represented the Electoral district of Elder in the South Australian House of Assembly as a member of the Labor Party from 1997 to 2014.  He was Minister for Transport, Minister for Infrastructure, and Minister for Energy, as well as the Leader of Government Business in the Lower House. Until early 2005, Conlon was also Emergency Services Minister and took part in the government's response to the  Eyre Peninsula bushfire (also known as Black Tuesday) in January 2005. Conlon was the most senior Labor Left figure in the Labor cabinet until April 2010 when he became unaligned.

He was formerly an organiser for the Liquor Hospitality and Miscellaneous Workers Union.

Early life

Born in Belfast, Northern Ireland, the seven-year-old Conlon was brought to South Australia by his family in 1966. They lived initially in Elizabeth before settling in Port Adelaide. Conlon was educated at LeFevre Boys Technical High School.  
 
His early jobs included being a roof tiler, storeperson, timberhand, deckhand, and signalperson. In 1983 he became a union organiser and five years later he took part-time Arts and Law classes at the University of Adelaide, which he funded through part-time work as an office cleaner, industrial officer, project officer and workers compensation employee advocate. He graduated with an Arts degree and with first class honours in Law. He won the Howard Zelling prize for Constitutional Law, the Stow Prize, and the David Murray Scholarship for his honours dissertation on employment law.

In the early 1990s he worked at law firm Duncan Basheer with Jay Weatherill and Isobel Redmond.

Parliament
Conlon was first elected to the South Australian House of Assembly as the member for the south-western Adelaide seat of Elder at the 1997 election with a 52.6 percent two-party vote from a 6.1 percent two-party swing. Conlon won a 53.7 percent two-party vote at the 2002 election. The 2006 election saw Conlon win a 64.9 percent two-party vote. The 2010 election saw Conlon win a 53.6 percent two-party vote.

Conlon served in many portfolios between 2002 and 2013 as a senior cabinet member, including Government Enterprises, Police, Emergency Services, Energy, Infrastructure, Transport, Industrial Relations, State/Local Government Relations, Housing and Urban Development, and Transport and Infrastructure.

After announcing in September 2012 his intention not to recontest his parliamentary seat at the 2014 election, Conlon announced in early March 2013 that he would immediately take up a salaried position with national law firm MinterEllison in Adelaide for the equivalent of three days per week.

Personal life
Conlon and his wife Tania have two daughters; Sadie Conlon born in December 2004 and Jemima Conlon. His hobbies include supporting the Port Adelaide Magpies, fishing, fine wine, and cooking.

References

 

1959 births
Adelaide Law School alumni
Living people
Members of the South Australian House of Assembly
Northern Ireland emigrants to Australia
Australian Labor Party members of the Parliament of South Australia
Politicians from Belfast
21st-century Australian politicians